Leningradsky District is an administrative district (raion), one of the thirty-eight in Krasnodar Krai, Russia. As a municipal division, it is incorporated as Leningradsky Municipal District. It is located in the north of the krai. Its administrative center is the rural locality (a stanitsa) of Leningradskaya. Population:  The population of Leningradskaya accounts for 58.2% of the district's total population.

Sister district
 Hounslow, England, United Kingdom

References

Notes

Sources

Districts of Krasnodar Krai
